Vautier is a surname. Notable people with the surname include:

Ben Vautier (born 1935), French artist
Cath Vautier (1902–1989), New Zealand netball player
Kerrin Vautier, New Zealand economist
René Vautier, (1928–2015), French filmmaker
Tristan Vautier (born 1989), French racing driver

See also
Saunders v Vautier, English trusts law case